The Teachers' Federation of Puerto Rico (FMPR) is a trade union federation of teachers in Puerto Rico. With currently 32,000 members, it is one of the most important non-US-aligned unions in the territory. Its primary base is among employees of the Puerto Rico Department of Education.

History

FMPR was formed in 1966 by radical union activists and led strikes in 1974 and 1993. During this time, it was loosely affiliated with the American Federation of Teachers (AFT). In 1999, Puerto Rico's teachers voted to be represented by FMPR instead of the rival Puerto Rico Teachers Association (APMR).

The same year, FMPR faced a scandal when its health plan went bankrupt while increasing portions of its budget were going to AFT. This led to growing dissatisfaction throughout the next years. In 2003, sitting president Renán Soto was defeated in an election by the leader of the "Compromiso, Democracia, Militancia" faction, Rafael Feliciano, who became new president.

In 2004, this new leadership held a referendum to disaffiliate from the AFT, which approved the measure by 19,400 to 5,882 votes. Meanwhile, negotiations with the Puerto Rican government over new work contracts for teachers did not produce a result. This led to a FMPR assembly vote in November 2007 which approved a strike, should it become necessary. Teachers were forbidden from striking by law and the Puerto Rican government quickly achieved the de-certification of FMPR.

In February 2008, at least 20,000 FMPR-affiliated teachers marched through San Juan. This march achieved the return of the government to negotiations with FMPR, even though it did still not officially recognise the union. After the failure of these negotiations, FMPR led a nine-day strike of around 11,000 members, paralysing education in Puerto Rico. In mid-2008, AMPR raided FMPR, a step that was denounced by independent unions. FMPR finally won the election, staying the representative union of teachers in Puerto Rico.

In January 2014, FMPR joined a 48-hour strike in support of teachers' pensions together with the National Union of Educators and Education Workers, Puerto Rican Educators in Action, National Organization of School Directors of Puerto Rico, Organization of Directors and Scholarly Administrators and its rival AMPR.

FMPR opposed the salary plans for teachers of the Alejandro García Padilla and the Ricardo Rosselló governments. In 2017, FMPR also opposed plans to lay off 3,000 education personnel.

FMPR protested in San Juan in February 2018 against a planned privatisation of 307 schools. The union accused the "charter" school system of being a way of transferring public money into private pockets, motivated by corruption. In March, the union also rejected the privatisation of the Puerto Rico Electric Power Authority and the University of Puerto Rico, again protesting in San Juan.  The next year, FMPR sued the Department of Education on behalf of a group of high school teachers in Toa Baja, stating they had not been properly paid.

FMPR challenged AMPR in representation elections in 2021. AMPR had been declared representative union for Puerto Rico's teachers in the meantime.

FMPR led protests through San Juan in February 2022 against a debt adjustment plan that reduced teachers' pensions and increased the retirement age to 63 years.

References

Education trade unions
Trade unions in Puerto Rico
American Federation of Teachers
Trade unions established in the 1960s
State wide trade unions in the United States
Education in Puerto Rico